Alexander Roldán León (born 28 July 1996) is a professional footballer who plays as a right-back for Major League Soccer club Seattle Sounders FC. Born in the United States, he captains the El Salvador national team.

Club career

College and amateur
Roldan attended El Rancho High School in Pico Rivera, California. He played soccer for The Dons helping them to the playoffs all four years and winning a state championship. With his time with The Dons, he earned first-team all-league three times, and was named league MVP in after his senior season.

Roldan spent his college career at the Seattle University. In his four seasons with the Redhawks, Roldan made a total of 82 appearances and tallied 18 goals and 17 assists.

Roldan also played in the National Premier Soccer League for OSA FC.

Professional
On January 19, 2018, Roldan was selected 22nd overall in the 2018 MLS SuperDraft by Seattle Sounders FC. He signed with the club in February 2018. Alex assisted his brother Cristian Roldan in his first-ever MLS career start against Sporting Kansas City. They became the fifth set of brothers to earn a goal/assist together. They also became the seventh pair of brothers in MLS history, including the first for the Sounders, to start together in an MLS match.

Roldan was out of contract with Seattle at the end of the 2019 season. He was re-signed by the Sounders on February 17, 2020.

Roldan enjoyed a breakout type run of form at the beginning of the 2021 MLS season. Throughout the first six matches of the 2021 MLS Season, Roldan recorded 2 assists from his position as a defender and played every minute. During a MLS match against San Jose Earthquakes, Seattle Sounders FC goalkeeper Stefan Frei left the match due to injury and with the club having already utilized their three opportunities to make substitutions, a field player was required to step into the goalkeeper position. Roldan, a defender, appeared in goal for the remaining five minutes of stoppage time, an occasion that has only occurred twelve times in MLS history.

International career
Eligible for the United States, Guatemala and El Salvador, it was reported in May 2021 that Roldan had turned down an approach from Guatemala. In June 2021 El Salvador head coach Hugo Pérez confirmed that Roldan had agreed to represent El Salvador. On June 18, he was named to El Salvador's provisional squad for the 2021 CONCACAF Gold Cup. On July 1, he was named to the final squad. On July 11 he made his international debut as a substitute in El Salvador's first group stage match against Guatemala, where he also got his first goal, scoring the first in a 2–0 victory.

Personal life
Roldan was born to an immigrant father from Guatemala and mother from El Salvador, Cesar and Ana respectively, and has two older brothers, Cesar Jr., who works as a trainer for the LA Galaxy, and Cristian, a midfielder for the Seattle Sounders FC.

Career statistics

Club

International 

 As of match played November 12, 2021. El Salvador score listed first, score column indicates score after each Roldan goal.

Honours
Seattle Sounders FC
MLS Cup: 2019
CONCACAF Champions League: 2022

Individual
MLS All-Star: 2021

References

External links

Sounders FC player profile

1996 births
Living people
People from Pico Rivera, California
Salvadoran footballers
El Salvador international footballers
American soccer players
Salvadoran people of Guatemalan descent
American sportspeople of Salvadoran descent
American people of Guatemalan descent
American sportspeople of North American descent
Sportspeople of Guatemalan descent
Soccer players from California
Sportspeople from Los Angeles County, California
Association football midfielders
Major League Soccer players
National Premier Soccer League players
USL Championship players
USL League Two players
Washington Crossfire players
Seattle Redhawks men's soccer players
Seattle Sounders FC draft picks
Seattle Sounders FC players
Tacoma Defiance players
Outfield association footballers who played in goal
2021 CONCACAF Gold Cup players